The New Jersey Department of Children and Families (DCF) is the state government agency dedicated to ensuring the safety, well-being and success of children, youth, families and communities in New Jersey through comprehensive oversight and programming.

History
In 2006, New Jersey Governor Jon Corzine proposed a revamping  of the statewide child welfare system, which was under the auspices of the Department of Human Services, and creation of a new cabinet-level department. He selected Kevin Ryan to lead as the first commissioner. The DCF was created in July 2006 with the dedicated goal to serve and safeguard the most vulnerable children and families in the state. It has evolved to be more inclusive of the extended community. As of 2018, there were approximately 6,600 employees.

Divisions
Child Protection and Permanency
Children's System of Care
Family and Community Partnerships
Adolescent Services
Advocacy
Education
Licensing
Performance Management and Accountability
Institutional Abuse Investigation Unit 
Women
Strategic Development

See also
Governorship of Chris Christie
Governorship of Phil Murphy

References 

Government agencies established in 2006
2006 establishments in New Jersey
Social work organizations in the United States
Children and Families